Under the Whyte notation for the classification of steam locomotives by wheel arrangement, a  is a Garratt articulated locomotive consisting of a pair of  engine units back to back, with the boiler and cab suspended between them. The  wheel arrangement has four leading wheels on two axles, usually in a leading bogie, eight powered and coupled driving wheels on four axles and two trailing wheels on one axle, usually in a trailing truck. Since the  type is generally known as a Mountain, the corresponding Garratt type is usually known as a Double Mountain.

Overview
A Garratt locomotive is actually two separate engines combined in a double articulated format, thereby providing multiple powered axles over which the total locomotive weight is spread. This results in a more powerful locomotive since, compared to a tender locomotive of similar total mass with tender included, a much larger percentage of the locomotive's total mass contributes to traction.

The  Double Mountain was probably the optimal Garratt wheel arrangement, with the four-wheeled leading bogies and the two-wheeled trailing trucks on each engine unit ensuring stability at speed and with sixteen coupled wheels for traction. More coupled wheels would inhibit the locomotive on tight curves, while the only advantage of more non-coupled wheels would be to reduce the axle loading.

The largest steam locomotive built in Europe was a  Garratt, built by Beyer, Peacock and Company for the Soviet Railways in 1932. The most numerous Garratt class in the world was also a Double Mountain, the Class GMA and GMAM of the South African Railways, of which 120 were built between 1954 and 1958.

Per definition, most Garratt locomotives are tank engines since they carry all their water and fuel in on-board water tanks and coal bunkers instead of in a separate tender. The three known exceptions were all tank-and-tender engines and were all  Garratts.

Usage

Angola

All three main railway systems in Angola used  Garratt locomotives.

The  Caminho de Ferro de Benguela (CFB) was the largest user, with 48 locomotives built by Beyer, Peacock & Company between 1927 and 1956. Six Class 10A locomotives were delivered in 1927, followed by fourteen Class 10B locomotives in 1930. In 1951 and 1952, eighteen Class 10C locomotives followed, and ten Class 10D locomotives were delivered in 1955 and 1956.

Six  Class 500 locomotives were built for the Caminhos de Ferro de Luanda (CFL) by Beyer, Peacock & Company in 1949. Six Class 550 locomotives, built for  gauge, were delivered to the same system by Friedrich Krupp in 1954.

The third system, the Caminhos de Ferro de Moçâmedes (CFM), bought six Class 100 locomotives from Henschel & Son in 1953.

Australia
Four classes of  Garratt locomotives entered service in Australia between 1929 and 1953, all on  gauge.

Beyer, Peacock & Company built three locomotives for the Emu Bay Railway in Tasmania in 1929.

The Australian Standard Garratt was developed in Australia during the Second World War, when the Commonwealth Land Transport Board (CLTB) commissioned Chief Mechanical Engineer Frederick Mills of the Western Australian Government Railways (WAGR) to design the locomotive as an emergency measure. Out of an intended 65 locomotives, 57 were built by the Midland Railway Workshops, Newport Workshops, Islington Workshops and Clyde Engineering between 1943 and 1945. The initial allocation was 23 locomotives to the Queensland Railways (QR), eight locomotives to the Tasmanian Government Railways, 25 locomotives to the WAGR and one to the Fyansford Cement Works Railway of Australian Portland Cement. Some of the locomotives later migrated from the QR and WAGR, where they were unpopular with crews, to other systems such as the South Australian Railways and the Emu Bay Railway.

Thirty BG class locomotives were built for the Queensland Railways in 1951, ten by Beyer, Peacock & Company and twenty by Société Franco-Belge.

Franco-Belge also built ten 400 Class locomotives for the South Australian Railways in 1953.

Kenya, Tanganyika and Uganda

This was the oil-fired EAR 59 class Garratt, of which 34 were built in two batches by Beyer, Peacock & Company in 1955. Although Garratt locomotives operated in all three territories, the 59 Class only worked in Kenya and latterly solely on the line between Nairobi and Mombasa. The last one was withdrawn from regular service in 1980.

South Africa
Five classes of Double Mountain locomotives, three of which were tank-and-tender Garratts, were acquired by the South African Railways (SAR) between 1929 and 1954.

During 1929 and 1930, the SAR placed eight Class GL Garratt locomotives in service, built by Beyer, Peacock & Company to specifications prepared by Chief Mechanical Engineer (CME) Colonel F.R. Collins. They were originally employed on the Durban to Cato Ridge section of the Natal mainline, until electrification between Durban and Pietermaritzburg in 1938 saw them transferred to the gruelling coal train run between Glencoe and Vryheid. This work entailed the regular haulage of 1200 tons up gradients of 1 in 50 (2%), taxing the Class GL even more heavily than the work for which it was designed. Despite this, they maintained an effective service along this line until its electrification in 1968, after which they spent their final working years operating on the line from Stanger to Empangeni.

During 1938 and 1939, the SAR placed sixteen Class GM Garratts, built by Beyer, Peacock, in goods train service on the line from Johannesburg via Krugersdorp and Zeerust to Mafeking. After the initial designs by CME W.A.J. Day were rejected by the Chief Civil Engineer because the weight on the leading and trailing bogies exceeded the acceptable limit for  rail, the water capacity of the front water tank was reduced to  while the rear bunker was redesigned to carry no water and with a coal capacity of 10 tons. The meagre water supply was augmented by semi-permanently coupling a specially built  capacity Type X-17 water tender to the locomotive. In effect, since Garratt locomotives had hitherto been considered as tank engines because they carry all their water and fuel on board, this arrangement introduced the tank-and-tender Garratt. In all other respects, the design followed that of the heavy Class GL Garratt.

During 1946 and 1947, the SAR placed fifty Class GEA Garratts in service. The order for fifty locomotives was the largest single Garratt order ever placed with Beyer, Peacock. Designed by CME Dr. M.M. Loubser as a development of the Class GE  locomotive, it was the first SAR Garratt to have streamlined water tanks and coal bunkers. Meant for goods traffic on light  rail on branch lines, the GEA was superheated and had Walschaerts valve gear. It was the only post-war SAR Garratt to be without a mechanical stoker and also one of the largest designs of Garratt to be hand-fired.

Between 1954 and 1958, 120 Class GMA branch line and Class GMAM mainline Garratts entered service. This was the most numerous Garratt class in the world. A development of the Class GM, the Classes GMA and GMAM were identical and their water and coal capacities could be adjusted to suit by installing or removing plates in the coal and water spaces. They could easily be converted back and forth between the two versions, and often were. Like the Class GM, it was a tank-and-tender Garratt and the water supply was augmented by semi-permanently coupling a  capacity Type X-17 or  capacity Type X-20 water tender to the locomotive. Designed under the supervision of CME L.C. Grubb, they were built by three manufacturers, 55 by Henschel & Son, 33 by Beyer, Peacock and 32 by North British Locomotive Company, subcontracted by Beyer, Peacock.

Also in 1954, 25 Class GO light branch line Garratts entered service. Designed under Grubb's supervision to operate on lighter rails, they were built by Henschel. In design and general appearance, the Class GO was very similar to the Class GMA, with the chief differences aimed at reducing weight, such as a smaller boiler with a reduced diameter, a smaller firebox and grate area and a half ton smaller capacity coal bunker. The Class GO was also a tank-and-tender Garratt and carried water only in its front tank while the rear bunker carried only coal, and it also ran with a semi-permanently coupled  capacity Type X-17 water tender.

Soviet Union
A  Garratt was built for the  gauge Soviet Railways by Beyer, Peacock and Company in 1932. This was the largest steam locomotive in Europe and the largest Garratt in the world. It weighed 262.5 tons in working order and produced  of tractive effort at 95% boiler pressure.

References

External links

8,4-8-2
88,4-8-2+2-8-4